Vivian Le (born July 30, 2000) is an American former competitive figure skater. She is a two-time bronze medalist on the ISU Junior Grand Prix series, the 2016 U.S Junior silver medalist, and the 2014 U.S Novice champion.

Personal life 
Le was born in Mesquite, Texas. She has an older brother named John and a younger sister named Diana, who swims competitively. She attends Spring Creek Academy.

Career

Early years
Le began skating at the age of five. During the 2013–14 season, she won the novice ladies' title at the 2014 U.S. Championships. In 2014–15, she moved up to the junior ranks and took bronze on that level at the 2015 U.S. Championships.

2015–16 season
Le made her ISU Junior Grand Prix (JGP) debut during the 2015–16 season. She won bronze at both of her assigned JGP events, in Bratislava, Slovakia and Colorado Springs, Colorado, and finished as the third alternate for the JGP Final. At the 2016 Midwestern Sectional Figure Skating Championships, Le won the gold medal on the junior level. She then closed her season at the 2016 U.S. Championships by winning the silver medal after placing second in both segments of the junior ladies' event.

Programs

Competitive highlights 
The JGP: Junior Grand Prix

References

2000 births
Living people
People from Mesquite, Texas
American female single skaters
21st-century American women